Guilherme Weber (born May 6, 1972) is a Brazilian actor, director and author.

Career

Guilherme began his career on theatre in 1989. He was fourteen years old when traveled with an amateur group to many cities in Brazil for four years. In 1992, he founded, with Felipe Hirsch, the theater company Sutil Companhia de Teatro. In the same year, their company received 17 awards in the category "Performances".

Works

Television 
 2013 - O Negócio - Ariel
 2008 - Queridos Amigos - Benny
 2008 - Ciranda de Pedra - Arthur X
 2007 - Malhação - Leôncio Gurgel
 2005 - Belíssima - Freddy Schneider
 2005 - Carandiru, Outras Histórias - Dudu
 2004 - Da Cor do Pecado - Tony Peixoto de Almeida
 2002 - Os Normais - Pedro Paulo
 2001 - Um Anjo Caiu do Céu - Carl

Theatre 
 2007 - Educação Sentimental do Vampiro (by Felipe Hirsch)
 2003 - Alice
 2003 - Death of a Salesman (A Morte de um Caixeiro Viajante)
 2003 - Temporada de Gripe
 2001 - Nostalgia
 2000 - A Vida é Cheia de Som e Fúria

Filmography 
 2004 - Árido Movie - Jonas
 2004 - Nina - Arthur
 2004 - Olga - Otto Braun
 1998 - Cruz e Sousa - O Poeta do Desterro
 1998 – Fui Rei

References

External links 

1972 births
Living people
Male actors from Curitiba
Brazilian people of German descent
Brazilian male stage actors
Brazilian male child actors
Brazilian male television actors
Brazilian male telenovela actors
Brazilian male film actors
Brazilian film directors
20th-century Brazilian male actors
21st-century Brazilian male actors